The Townsend Prize for Fiction is awarded biennially (that is, every two years) to a writer from the U.S. state of Georgia for the best novel published during those years, by the Georgia Center for the Book and The Chattahoochee Review the literary journal of Perimeter College at Georgia State University. The award was named in honor of the founding editor of Atlanta magazine, Jim Townsend. It was first granted in 1982.

Previous winners 
 Celestine Sibley, Children, My Children (1982)
 Alice Walker, The Color Purple (1984)
 Philip Lee Williams, The Heart of a Distant Forest (1986)
 Mary Hood, And Venus Is Blue (1988)
 Sara Flanigan, Alice (1989)
 Charlie Smith, The Lives of the Dead (1990)
 Ferrol Sams, When All the World Was Young  (1991)
 Pam Durban, The Laughing Place (1994)
 JoAllen Bradham, Some Personal Papers (1996)
 Judson Mitcham, The Sweet Everlasting (1998)
 James Kilgo, Daughter of My People (2000)
 Ha Jin, The Bridegroom (short story collection) (2002)
 Terry Kay, The Valley of Light (2004)
 Judson Mitcham, Sabbath Creek (2006)
 Renee Dodd, A Cabinet of Wonders (2008)
 Kathryn Stockett, The Help (2010)
 Thomas Mullen, The Many Deaths of the Firefly Brothers (2012)
 Mary Hood, A Clear View of the Southern Sky (2016)
 Julia Franks, Over the Plain Houses (2018)
 Xhenet Aliu, Brass (2020)

References

American fiction awards
Awards established in 1981